Turner Entertainment Company is an American multimedia company founded by Ted Turner on August 2, 1986. Purchased by Time Warner on October 10, 1996 as part of its acquisition of Turner Broadcasting System (TBS), the company was largely responsible for overseeing the TBS library for worldwide distribution. In recent years, this role has largely been limited to being the copyright holder, as it has become an in-name-only subsidiary of Warner Bros., which currently administers their library.

Background
On March 25, 1986, Ted Turner and his Turner Broadcasting System purchased Metro-Goldwyn-Mayer (MGM) from Kirk Kerkorian for $1.5 billion, and renamed MGM Entertainment Company, Inc. However, due to concerns in the financial community over the debt-load of his companies, on August 26, 1986, he was forced to sell the MGM name, all of United Artists, and the MGM Culver City-based studio  lot back to Kerkorian for approximately $300 million after months of ownership. But in order to manage the vault, Turner kept the studio's film, television and cartoon library as well as a small portion of the United Artists library, forming Turner Entertainment Company. The company was headed by Roger Mayer, who was former executive of MGM, and formed a development division with the intention of making movies and TV shows. The library also included the pre-1950 Warner Bros. library (as well as most of the pre-August 1948 Looney Tunes and Merrie Melodies cartoons), the Fleischer Studios/Famous Studios Popeye cartoons originally released by Paramount Pictures, the US/Canadian/Latin American/Australian distribution rights to the RKO Radio Pictures library, and most of the Gilligan's Island television franchise (not counting the TV movie sequels owned by other companies), all of which were owned by United Artists. In order to use funds, Turner instituted a policy that they would pass on making sequels to classic Turner-owned properties, in favor of making colorization of old black-and-white movies. On December 2, 1987, Turner Entertainment had entered into an agreement with American Film Technologies to computer-colorize three films that were originally in black-and-white, namely the three films from the MGM library, such as Boom Town, They Were Expendable and Catered Affair, and Turner would have the option to have AFT to have an order for additional 22 films and has a second option for another 24 films between now and 1992. On December 10, 1987, Turner acquired the worldwide licensing rights to 800 of RKO's films from its then-parent company Wesray Capital Corporation.

On October 3, 1988, Turner Broadcasting launched the TNT network, and later Turner Classic Movies in 1994 to use their former MGM/UA library. In doing so, Turner has played a major part in film preservation and restoration. By broadcasting such classic films as King Kong, The Wizard of Oz, Gone with the Wind, Citizen Kane, Casablanca, Meet Me in St. Louis, Singin' in the Rain and the original The Jazz Singer, on numerous Turner affiliated cable channels, as well as in showing them in revival movie houses and home video worldwide, Turner introduced a new generation to these films.

On November 29, 1989, Turner made another attempt to buy MGM/UA, but the deal failed, and they formed Turner Pictures and Turner Pictures Worldwide instead (though the MGM Home Entertainment titles are currently exclusively distributed by Warner Bros. Home Entertainment).

On October 29, 1991, Turner acquired Hanna-Barbera Productions and most of the pre-1991 Ruby-Spears Productions library from Great American Broadcasting for $320 million. Shortly after the acquisition, on October 1, 1992, Turner Broadcasting launched Cartoon Network, and later Boomerang, to use its vast animation library for primary broadcasts.

On August 17, 1993, Turner purchased Castle Rock Entertainment and New Line Cinema for over $650 million.

Turner Entertainment self-distributed much of its library for the first decade of its existence, but on October 10, 1996, Turner Broadcasting was purchased by Time Warner and its distribution functions were largely absorbed into Warner Bros. As a result, Turner is now an in-name-only subsidiary of Warner, serving merely as a copyright holder for a portion of their library. Hanna-Barbera's current purpose as the in-name only unit of Warner Bros. Animation is to serve as the copyright holder for its creations such as The Flintstones, Scooby-Doo and Yogi Bear while Warner Bros. handles sales and merchandising.

Production company
As a production company, Turner Entertainment also created original in-house programming, such as documentaries about the films it owns, new animated material based on Tom & Jerry and other related cartoon properties, and once produced made-for-television films, miniseries, and theatrical films such as Gettysburg, Tom and Jerry: The Movie, Fallen, The Pagemaster and Cats Don't Dance under the Turner Pictures banner. In 1995, the Turner Pictures production company developed a film slate. Turner also had an international distribution sales unit, accordingly named Turner Pictures Worldwide Distribution, Inc. Turner Pictures was folded into Warner Bros. after the Turner-Time Warner merger, and currently holds the distribution rights to the films made by the production division. Time Warner transferred some of Turner's leftover projects like City of Angels and You've Got Mail into Warner Bros.

Turner Feature Animation

Turner Feature Animation was Turner's Animation unit headed by David Kirschner and Paul Gertz. The two animated movies The Pagemaster and Cats Don't Dance were produced under Turner's animation unit.  Spun off from the feature film division of Hanna-Barbera Productions, Turner Feature Animation was folded into Warner Bros. Feature Animation, which was then merged into Warner Bros. Animation.

Home video

In the first decade of its existence, Turner released most of its own catalogue on home video through Turner Home Entertainment (THE). However, the MGM and Warner film libraries which Turner owned were still distributed by MGM/UA Home Video along with THE until their rights expired in 1999, while THE handled the home video distribution of titles from the RKO library. THE released films produced by Turner Pictures on home video with their distributors and independently released the Hanna-Barbera cartoon library on home video.

Turner Home Entertainment also released World Championship Wrestling (WCW) pay-per-view events, wrestler profiles, and "Best Of" packages on video until the demise of WCW in 2001; the WCW video library, along with the rights to the WCW name and certain talent contracts, were sold to the World Wrestling Federation (WWF, now known as WWE) in March 2001. In 1987, Turner Home Entertainment had inked a distribution deal with the Video Institute of the Soviet Union to release 10 titles from the pre-1986 MGM library in Russian videocassette rental shops, and the deal with Turner would be a first for the Soviet home video market, where officials indicate that there are 660,000 VCR recordings, and films include Zabriskie Point, and other titles, none of them were colorized.

From early 1995 to early 1997, THE also distributed home video releases from New Line Home Video, taking over from Columbia TriStar Home Video as well as distributing PBS programs on home video the year before (taking over from the defunct Pacific Arts). NLHE distributed New Line films on video by itself from 1997 until the Warner Bros. New Line Cinema merger in 2008. PBS shows are now distributed on video and DVD by PBS's own distribution company, PBS Distribution.

In 1995, THE entered a distribution deal with Columbia TriStar Home Video in France, Britain, Germany, Austria and Switzerland, the deal expired in 1997 (although some films released on VHS by THE are distributed in the UK by First Independent Films).

Upon the Turner-Time Warner merger, THE was absorbed into Warner Home Video as an in-name-only unit in December 1996. However, Turner Classic Movies does release special edition DVD boxsets of films from both the Turner and Warner catalogs under the TCM label. (Some magazines, most notably Starlog, when listing upcoming releases from Warner related to Cartoon Network programming listed it as being released by THE, likely to differentiate it from other, adult-oriented titles.)

Library

Turner Entertainment's current library includes:
 The Brut Productions library
 Nearly all of Metro-Goldwyn-Mayer's film, television and cartoon library released prior to May 23, 1986
 Material from MGM's predecessors (Metro Pictures, Goldwyn Pictures, and Mayer Pictures) post-1915 that did not enter the public domain
 Some material from United Artists, including:
 The US and Canadian distribution rights to the RKO Radio Pictures library
 Most of the Gilligan's Island franchise (the original series and animated sequels)
 The former Associated Artists Productions catalogue, which includes:
 Warner Bros.' library of films released prior to January 1, 1950
 The pre-August 1948 Warner Bros. Cartoons library (color cartoons only)
 The Harman and Ising-produced Merrie Melodies cartoons
 The Fleischer Studios/Famous Studios Popeye cartoons, originally released by Paramount Pictures between 1933 and 1957
 The majority of the Hanna-Barbera Productions library
 Almost all of the pre-1991 Ruby-Spears Enterprises library

Notes

References

External links
 

American companies established in 1986
Mass media companies established in 1986
1996 mergers and acquisitions
Mass media companies of the United States
Film distributors of the United States
Warner Bros. divisions
Turner Broadcasting System